This is a discography of Milli Vanilli, a pop/dance music project formed by Frank Farian in Germany in 1988, fronted by Fab Morvan and Rob Pilatus.

The discography consists of three studio albums solely by Milli Vanilli released in different parts of the world, two remix albums released worldwide, an album by The Real Milli Vanilli released shortly after the exposure, an album by Rob & Fab, the two original members, and the singles.

Milli Vanilli's first album, All or Nothing, was released in Europe in mid-1988. The success of the record brought attention of Arista Records who signed the duo and released their album in the US with different name, Girl You Know It's True. In the United Kingdom, the double album 2 X 2 was released; the first CD being the original All or Nothing and the second the remix album.

All of the singles released from the album made it into Billboard Hot 100 top 5. The first single, "Girl You Know It's True", reached No. 2. The following single, "Baby Don't Forget My Number", became the duo's first number one song, with the next two singles—"Blame It on the Rain" and "Girl I'm Gonna Miss You"—topping the chart as well. The final single, "All or Nothing", reached No. 4.

Albums

Studio albums

Remix albums

Compilation albums 
 Maximum Millli Vanilli: Hits That Shook the World (1990) (promotional album)
 Best of the Best/Greatest Hits (2006)
 Girl You Know It's True: The Best of Milli Vanill (2013)

Unreleased albums 
 Back and in Attack (1998)

Other related albums 
 Try 'N' B – Try 'N' B (1992)
 Rob & Fab – Rob & Fab (1993)
 Fab Morvan – Love Revolution (2003)

Singles 

Notes:

 A  credited as "The Real Milli Vanilli"
 B  credited as "Rob & Fab"

Videography

Notes

References

External links 
 

Discographies of German artists
Pop music group discographies